Dodford may refer to:
 Dodford, Northamptonshire, England
 Dodford, Worcestershire, England